

N'Dhala Gorge Nature Park is a protected area in the Northern Territory of Australia consisting of an area of low sand dunes, rocky outcrops, about   east of Alice Springs. It is significant principally because of thousands of Indigenous rock carvings.

Description

N'Dhala Gorge Nature Park is located in the eastern MacDonnell Ranges. It contains approximately 6,000 stone carvings, or petroglyphs, as well as a wide variety of rare Australian plant life.

The gorge was used by the Eastern Arrernte people, who called the area Ilwentje. It contains men's sacred sites, petroglyphs, shelter or occupation sites and art sites. The 6,000 stone carvings are believed to have been created  in two separate periods, the first approximately ten thousand years ago, and the second approximately three thousand years ago. They could be created by using two different techniques: either by pounding a rocky surface with another rock, or by a fine pecking technique.

Significant plant life in the area includes the undoolya wattle and the peach-leafed poison bush.

Gallery of rock carvings

See also
 Protected areas of the Northern Territory
 Chambers Pillar
 Henbury Meteorites Conservation Reserve
 Rainbow Valley Conservation Reserve
 Uluṟu-Kata Tjuṯa National Park
 Watarrka National Park
 Ewaninga Rock Carvings Conservation Reserve

References

External links
Official webpage
Webpage on the Protected Planet website

Nature parks of the Northern Territory
Protected areas established in 1962
1962 establishments in Australia
Australian Aboriginal mythology
Australian Aboriginal cultural history
Rock art in Australia
Arrernte